The Mirror Reporter is a weekly newspaper published in Clear Lake, Iowa.

History of the Mirror Reporter
The first Clear Lake newspaper was the Independent, established by Silas Noyes and John M. Brainard. The first issue bore the date, February 10, 1860. Its publication was continued for about a year, when it was moved to Hancock Country. The Observer was then established in 1869. George E. Frost was the first proprietor of the Observer. After two years of editorship he sold the office to Judge M.P. Rosecrans who made the paper entirely independent, in tone and sentiment, where before it had been strongly republican. Mr. Rosecrans soon sold the office to parties in Belmond. Mr. Frost then purchased a new outfit and for 6 or 7 years was the editor. In 1879 he sold to Mr. Bush who changed the name to the Clear Lake Mirror.
In April 1896, J.C. Davenport established another weekly paper here which he called the Clear Lake Reporter. These two weekly newspapers combined under one ownership with B. Dayton Merriman, who owned the Reporter, buying the Mirror in 1951. They operated as twin weeklies with the Mirror published on Tuesdays and the Reporter on Fridays until January 1955 when the two joined together to become the Mirror and Reporter. The Clear Lake Mirror-Reporter was sold by Mid-America Publishing Corporation in 1983 to Prefin, Inc. The team of Dave Presler and Michael Finnegan comprised the business which also owned other area newspapers. Presler moved on from the company and focus was placed to ownership of the Clear Lake paper by Finnegan. The paper publishes weekly on Wednesdays. On March 1, 2018, Mid-America Publishing Corporation re-acquired the Mirror-Reporter.

The staff of the Mirror Reporter is as follows:

  - Publisher
 Marianne Gasaway - Editor: Marianne Gasaway joined the Clear Lake Mirror-Reporter as editor when Prefin acquired the newspaper from Mid-America Publishing Corp. in 1983. She performs a variety of duties, including coverage of city government and school issues, as well as all aspects of the news department. Following graduation from Newman High School in Mason City, she earned a BA degree in Journalism from Iowa State University.
 Katie Behr - Office Manager, Classifieds, Billing, Circulation, Obituaries, and Legals  
 Kathleen Thul - Social & Legals, Obituaries, Production Manager
 Michelle Watson - Opinion, Sports, Agri.-Business, Home Buyers Guide, Production 
 Chris Barragy - Photography, Website Coordinator, Graphic Design, and Production 
 Larry Hahn - Distribution

External links
Mirror Reporter Website

Newspapers published in Iowa
Cerro Gordo County, Iowa
1869 establishments in Iowa
Clear Lake, Iowa